Route 92, also known as North Harbour-Branch Highway, is a  highway on the Avalon Peninsula of the Canadian province of Newfoundland and Labrador.  Its northern terminus is an intersection at Route 91, near the town of Colinet, and its southern terminus is at the town of Branch, where the route transitions into Route 100.

Route description

Route 92 begins at an intersection between Route 100 (Cape Shore Highway) and Loop Road in Branch and heads east to immediately cross a large Inlet via a Causeway. It then leaves town and winds its way along the coastline for several kilometres as it crosses the Beckfords River. The highway crosses the Red Head River before turning more inland and northeast through rural hilly terrain. Route 92 briefly follows the water again as it passes through North Harbour before turning completely north to cross another river and coming to an end at an intersection with Route 91 (Old Placentia Highway) between Colinet and Cataracts Provincial Park.

Major intersections

References

092